Sadhu Sant is a 1991 Hindi Indian film announced, starring Amitabh Bachchan and Mithun Chakraborty. The film was much awaited, but never graced theatres.

Synopsis 

Sadhu Sant was a much awaited film starring Amitabh Bachchan and Mithun Chakraborty, But the film was shelved due to creative differences.

Cast 
Amitabh Bachchan [Ravi Singh]
Mithun Chakraborty [Samar Kumar]
Hema Malini  [Priya Khanna]	
Suresh Oberoi [ Vinay Kakkar]	
Amrita Singh [Meena Kapoor]
Amrish Puri

Soundtrack

References

External links 
 

1991 films
1990s Hindi-language films
Indian action films
Unreleased Hindi-language films
Hindi-language action films